Bernardo Schappo (born 22 March 1999), sometimes known as just Bernardo, is a Brazilian footballer who plays as a central defender for Ituano.

Club career
Born in Antônio Carlos, Santa Catarina, Bernardo joined Ituano's youth setup in 2017, aged 18. He made his first team debut on 8 August 2018, coming on as a first-half substitute in a 3–1 Copa Paulista away loss against Nacional-SP.

On 15 December 2019, Bernardo was promoted to the first team ahead of the 2020 season. After being only a backup option in his first years, he became a first-choice during the 2021 Série C, as his side achieved promotion to the Série B.

On 9 March 2022, Bernardo renewed his contract with Galo until December 2024.

Career statistics

Honours
Ituano
Campeonato Brasileiro Série C: 2021

References

1999 births
Living people
Sportspeople from Santa Catarina (state)
Brazilian footballers
Association football defenders
Campeonato Brasileiro Série B players
Campeonato Brasileiro Série C players
Ituano FC players